In cricket, a five-wicket haul (also known as a "five–for" or "fifer") refers to a bowler taking five or more wickets in a single innings. James Anderson, an English cricketer has taken 33 five-wicket hauls in international cricket. A right-arm fast-medium bowler, Anderson has played 172 Tests and 194 One Day International (ODI) matches for his country, and has taken 631 and 269 wickets respectively. He was honoured with the NBC Denis Compton Award for "The Most Promising Young Player" in 2002, and the Wisden Cricketers' Almanack named him one of their cricketers of the year in 2009. In 2013, former Pakistan captain, Wasim Akram described him as "the best bowler of this era".

Anderson took a five-wicket haul on his Test debut in 2003 against Zimbabwe at Lord's Cricket Ground. He took 5 wickets for 73 runs in the match which England won by an innings and 92 runs. In July 2010, he took five-wicket hauls in both innings of a Test match against Pakistan at the Trent Bridge. In total, he took 11 wickets for 71 runs, which remains his best bowling figures in a Test match . He took another pair of five-wicket hauls at the same venue, against Australia in the first Test of the 2013 Ashes series. Anderson's career-best figures for an innings are 7 wickets for 42 runs against West Indies at Lord's Cricket Ground, in September 2017. , he has taken 32 Test five-wicket hauls at 11 cricket grounds, and has been most successful against India with six five-wicket hauls against them.

Anderson made his ODI debut against Australia at the Melbourne Cricket Ground during the 2002–03 VB series;  England lost the match by 89 runs. His first ODI five-wicket haul came in November 2009 against South Africa at the St George's Oval. His career best performance of 5 wickets for 23 runs in the match earned him the man of the match award. Anderson has taken two five-wicket hauls in ODI cricket.

Making his first Twenty20 International (T20I) appearance in 2007, Anderson has yet to take a five-wicket haul in the format . His best performance in T20I is 3 wickets for 23 runs, against the Netherlands at Lord's Cricket Ground during the 2009 ICC World Twenty20. , he is eighth overall among all-time five-wicket haul takers, and first in the equivalent list for England.

Key

Tests

One Day Internationals

Notes

References

External links
 
 

Lists of English cricket records and statistics
Anderson, James